Tragana is a town in Messenia in Greece.  An early Bronze age cremation was found there.

References

Villages in Greece
Populated places in Messenia